The Macau national ice hockey team is the national men's ice hockey team that represents Macau, China in international competitions and as an associate member of the International Ice Hockey Federation (IIHF). Macau is not ranked in the IIHF World Rankings and have not entered in any World Championships nor at any Olympic Games, but have played in the Challenge Cup of Asia, a regional tournament for lower-tier hockey nations in Asia.

History

Roster
Roster for the 2016 IIHF Challenge Cup of Asia – Division I.

All-time record against other nations
As of April 25, 2017

See also
 Sports in Macau

References

External links 
IIHF Official Site

National ice hockey teams in Asia
Ice hockey